Louise Cooper is a former women's footballer. Cooper's greatest achievement was winning the 1996 FA Women's Cup Final with Croydon Women.

Honours
Croydon
 FA Women's Cup: 1996

References

Living people
Women's association football goalkeepers
English women's footballers
Charlton Athletic W.F.C. players
Millwall Lionesses L.F.C. players
Year of birth missing (living people)